Joseph Chester Stephenson (June 30, 1921 – September 20, 2001) was a catcher in Major League Baseball who played for the New York Giants (1943), Chicago Cubs (1944) and Chicago White Sox (1947). Following his retirement as a player, Stephenson gained most of his fame as a scout for the Boston Red Sox based in Orange County, California, signing future All-Stars Rick Burleson, Dwight Evans, Bill Lee and Fred Lynn during his tenure of nearly 50 years as a scout in the Boston organization.

A native of Detroit, Michigan, and an alumnus of Michigan State University and Western Michigan University, Stephenson's minor league career extended from 1941 through 1951. He caught in part of three big-league seasons in the 1940s. He posted a .179 batting average (12-for-67) with eight runs and four RBI in 29 games played.

He was the father of Jerry Stephenson (1944–2010), like Joe a former MLB player (as a pitcher) who became a longtime scout.

See also
List of second-generation Major League Baseball players

External links

Baseball Library
Historic Baseball

1921 births
2001 deaths
Baseball players from Detroit
Birmingham Barons players
Boston Red Sox scouts
Chicago Cubs players
Chicago White Sox players
Clovis Pioneers players
Fort Smith Giants players
Jersey City Giants players
Los Angeles Angels (minor league) players
Lubbock Hubbers players
Major League Baseball catchers
Memphis Chickasaws players
Milwaukee Brewers (minor league) players
Minor league baseball managers
New York Giants (NL) players
Roanoke Red Sox players
San Jose Red Sox players
Sportspeople from Fullerton, California
Springfield Rifles players
Waterloo Hawks (baseball) players
Waterloo White Hawks players
Western Michigan Broncos baseball players